
Gmina Pruchnik is an urban-rural gmina (administrative district) in Jarosław County, Subcarpathian Voivodeship, in south-eastern Poland.

It was formerly classified as a rural gmina, becoming urban-rural when Pruchnik became a town on 1 January 2011.

Villages
Apart from the town of Pruchnik, Gmina Pruchnik contains the villages and settlements of Hawłowice, Jodłówka, Kramarzówka, Rozbórz Długi, Rozbórz Okrągły, Rzeplin and Świebodna.

Neighbouring gminas
Gmina Pruchnik is bordered by the gminas of Dubiecko, Kańczuga, Krzywcza, Roźwienica and Zarzecze.

References

Polish official population figures 2006

Pruchnik
Jarosław County